Pressler (or Preßler) is a German surname. Notable people with the surname include:

 Johann Valentin Pressler - German ancestor of Elvis Presley who changed his name to Presley during the American Civil War
 Kimberly Pressler (born 1977), American sports reporter and former Miss USA
 Larry Pressler (born 1942), American politician
 Menahem Pressler (born 1923), German-born Israeli-American pianist
 Mike Pressler (born 1960), American lacrosse coach
 Mirjam Pressler (1940–2019), German novelist and translator
 Paul Pressler, American business executive
 Paul Pressler (politician) (born 1930), American politician and judge
 Sylvia Pressler (1934–2010), American judge

References 

German-language surnames
Jewish surnames